Gladioconus is a synonym of a subgenus  of sea snails, marine gastropod mollusks in the genus Conus, family Conidae, the cone snails and their allies. T

In the latest classification of the family Conidae by Puillandre N., Duda T.F., Meyer C., Olivera B.M. & Bouchet P. (2015), Gladioconus has become a subgenus of Conus as Conus (Monteiroconus) represented as Conus Linnaeus, 1758

Distinguishing characteristics
The Tucker & Tenorio 2009 taxonomy distinguishes Gladioconus from Conus in the following ways:

 Genus Conus sensu stricto Linnaeus, 1758
 Shell characters (living and fossil species)
The basic shell shape is conical to elongated conical, has a deep anal notch on the shoulder, a smooth periostracum and a small operculum. The shoulder of the shell is usually nodulose and the protoconch is usually multispiral. Markings often include the presence of tents except for black or white color variants, with the absence of spiral lines of minute tents and textile bars.
Radular tooth (not known for fossil species)
The radula has an elongated anterior section with serrations and a large exposed terminating cusp, a non-obvious waist, blade is either small or absent and has a short barb, and lacks a basal spur.
Geographical distribution
These species are found in the Indo-Pacific region.
Feeding habits
These species eat other gastropods including cones.

 Subgenus Gladioconus Tucker & Tenorio, 2009
Shell characters (living and fossil species)
The shell is obconic to turbinate in shape, with broad shoulders.  The protoconch is multispiral, and the whorls have nodules which may persist or become obsolete.  The body whorl is typically ornamented with ridges.  The anal notch is fairly deep, except in smaller specimens.  The color patterns include brown or red banded shells, and rarely mostly white shells.  The periostracum is tufted, and the operculum is small.
Radular tooth (not known for fossil species)
The anterior sections of the radular tooth is longer than or similar in length to the posterior section.  The blade is long, and is more than half as long as the anterior section of the tooth.  A basal spur is present, the barb is short, and there is an internal terminating cusp.  The radular tooth has coarse serrations.
Geographical distribution
The species in this genus occur in the West Atlantic and Eastern Pacific regions, and one species is endemic to the Marquesas Islands.
Feeding habits
These cone snails are vermivorous, meaning that the cones prey on polychaete worms.

Species list
This list of species is based on the information in the World Register of Marine Species (WoRMS) list. Species within the genus Gladioconus include:
 Gladioconus binghamae (Petuch, 1987): synonym of Conus binghamae Petuch, 1987
 Gladioconus cuna (Petuch, 1998): synonym of  Conus cuna Petuch, 1998
 Gladioconus gladiator (Broderip, 1833): synonym of  Conus gladiator Broderip, 1833
 Gladioconus glenni (Petuch, 1993): synonym of  Conus glenni Petuch, 1993
 Gladioconus granulatus (Linnaeus, 1758): synonym of  Conus granulatus Linnaeus, 1758
 Gladioconus hieroglyphus (Duclos, 1833): synonym of  Conus hieroglyphus Duclos, 1833
 Gladioconus hivanus (Moolenbeek, Zandbergen & Bouchet, 2008): synonym of  Conus hivanus Moolenbeek, Zandbergen & Bouchet, 2008
 Gladioconus mus (Hwass in Bruguière, 1792): synonym of  Conus mus Hwass in Bruguière, 1792
 Gladioconus patae (Abbott, 1971): synonym of  Conus patae Abbott, 1971
 Gladioconus ritae (Petuch, 1995): synonym of  Conus ritae Petuch, 1995

References

Further reading 
 Kohn A. A. (1992). Chronological Taxonomy of Conus, 1758-1840". Smithsonian Institution Press, Washington and London.
 Monteiro A. (ed.) (2007). The Cone Collector 1: 1-28.
 Berschauer D. (2010). Technology and the Fall of the Mono-Generic Family The Cone Collector 15: pp. 51-54
 Puillandre N., Meyer C.P., Bouchet P., and Olivera B.M. (2011), Genetic divergence and geographical variation in the deep-water Conus orbignyi complex (Mollusca: Conoidea)'', Zoologica Scripta 40(4) 350-363.

External links
 To World Register of Marine Species
  Gastropods.com: Conidae setting forth the genera recognized therein.

Conidae
Gastropod subgenera